Thomas James Kurvers (September 14, 1962 – June 21, 2021) was an American professional ice hockey defenseman in the National Hockey League (NHL). He spent eleven seasons in the NHL between 1984 and 1995. He won the 1984 Hobey Baker award as the best collegiate ice hockey player, and won the Stanley Cup with the Montreal Canadiens in 1986. After his playing career, he was an executive for the Phoenix Coyotes, the Tampa Bay Lightning and then the Minnesota Wild.

Playing career
Kurvers played collegiately at the University of Minnesota Duluth, and was selected 145th overall by the Montreal Canadiens in the 1981 NHL Entry Draft following his freshman season. His time at Duluth culminated in winning the Hobey Baker Award, given to the most outstanding collegiate hockey player in the National Collegiate Athletic Association (NCAA), as a senior in the 1983–84 season after registering 76 points in just 43 games.

Kurvers made his National Hockey League (NHL) debut in the 1984–85 season with the Montreal Canadiens, with whom he won the Stanley Cup in 1986. After two full seasons with the Canadiens, and one game in the 1986–87 season, he was traded to the Buffalo Sabres for a draft pick.

Before the 1987–88 season, the Sabres traded Kurvers to the New Jersey Devils. He played his most productive post-season hockey that year for the Devils, posting 15 points in 19 games during their run to the 1988 Wales Conference Finals. He followed up by notching career highs of 16 goals and 66 points in the 1988–89 season. He played two full seasons, and one game in the 1989–90 season, with the Devils before being traded to the Toronto Maple Leafs for the pick ultimately used to draft Scott Niedermayer.

Kurvers was a highly skilled, puck-moving defenceman, especially dangerous on the power play. Later in his career, Kurvers became a journeyman, making stops with the Vancouver Canucks, New York Islanders, and Mighty Ducks of Anaheim before leaving the league after the 1994–95 season. He played a season in Japan before retiring.

In his NHL career, Kurvers appeared in 659 games. He scored 93 goals and added 328 assists for 421 points. He also appeared in 57 Stanley Cup playoff games, scoring eight goals and recording 22 assists.

Post-hockey career
Following his retirement from playing professional hockey, Kurvers landed a job as a radio commentator for the Phoenix Coyotes, in part due to his connection to former Montreal teammate Bobby Smith who was the general manager in Phoenix at the time. Following one season in that capacity, he was hired as a professional scout by the Coyotes. Kurvers was promoted to director of player personnel in 2005.

In 2008, Kurvers was named assistant general manager of the Tampa Bay Lightning. He became the interim general manager for the Lightning at the end of the 2009–10 season. From 2011 to 2018, Kurvers served as the senior advisor to the general manager of the Tampa Bay Lightning before being named the assistant general manager of the Minnesota Wild.

Personal life
Born in Minneapolis, Minnesota, Tom Kurvers grew up in nearby Bloomington.

Kurvers and his wife Heather had two children together. He also had two daughters from his first marriage. In January 2019, Kurvers was diagnosed with adenocarcinoma, a type of non-small-cell lung cancer. Kurvers died on June 21, 2021, from cancer at the age of 58.

Awards and honors
In 1991, Kurvers was inducted into the University of Minnesota Duluth Hall of Fame.

Career statistics

Regular season and playoffs

Sources:

International

Sources:

References

External links

1962 births
2021 deaths
AHCA Division I men's ice hockey All-Americans
American men's ice hockey defensemen
Arizona Coyotes announcers
Arizona Coyotes coaches
Arizona Coyotes executives
Arizona Coyotes scouts
Buffalo Sabres players
Capital District Islanders players
Deaths from cancer in Minnesota
Deaths from lung cancer
Hobey Baker Award winners
Ice hockey people from Minnesota
Ice hockey coaches from Minnesota
Ice hockey people from Minneapolis
Mighty Ducks of Anaheim players
Minnesota Duluth Bulldogs men's ice hockey players
Minnesota Wild executives
Montreal Canadiens draft picks
Montreal Canadiens players
New Jersey Devils players
New York Islanders players
Sportspeople from Bloomington, Minnesota
Stanley Cup champions
Tampa Bay Lightning executives
Tampa Bay Lightning personnel
Toronto Maple Leafs players
Vancouver Canucks players
Sports coaches from Minneapolis